Işıktepe is a village in the Mersin Province, Turkey. It's part of Toroslar district (which is an intracity district within Mersin city). It is situated in the southern slopes of  the Toros Mountains at  close to Hamzabeyli, another village. The population of the village  was 127  as of 2012.

References

External links
For images by Seyit Işık

Villages in Toroslar District